Precious Emuejeraye (born 21 March 1983) is a professional footballer who last played for Churchill Brothers in the I-League. Born in Nigeria, he represents the Singapore national team. Now, he coaches in the Liverpool International Academy in Singapore.

Club career

Jurong FC 
Emuejeraye came to Singapore in 2002 from Nigeria after being signed by the now-defunct S-League side Jurong FC. He made his debut for Jurong on February 21, 2002 against Sembawang Rangers and scored his first goal for the club in the Singapore Cup semi-final against Geylang United in the same year.

Young Lions 
Even though Jurong FC folded a year later, his impressive performances in league did not go unnoticed, as the Young Lions signed him next.

Gombak United 
In 2006, Gombak United snapped up the burly defender after doing well in his 3 years with the Young Lions. He won the 2008 Singapore League Cup with the bulls.

Woodlands Wellington 
He was snapped up by new Woodlands Wellington FC's coach, Nenad Bacina, who signed him for the 2009 season.

Move to Indonesia 
Following the disbandment of the national team due to poor showings in the AFF Suzuki cup, he moved to Indonesia to start afresh. He signed for Indonesia Super League club, Sriwijaya and helped the club to the 2010 Piala Indonesia.

He next move to Persija Jakarta before moving to Persiba Balikpapan. He was, however, sacked by the club following poor performances. He trained with Woodlands Wellington before being snapped up by Persidafon Dafonsoro and made his debut for the club in a 3-1 loss against his former club Sriwijaya FC on 16 May 2013.

Persidafon Dafonsoro proved to be his last club in Indonesia as a decrease in the slots for Asian players from two to one saw him return home in 2014.

Home United 
Before signing for S. League club Home United in 2014, Emuejeraye went on trials in Thailand but found that many clubs have filled their foreign signing slots. His chance at Home came as a coincidence as he was merely looking for somewhere to train to keep himself match fit and stumbled upon Home's training who coincidentally had a free slot left for registration. He was released at the end of the season.

Putrajaya SPA 
Following his release by Home United, Emuejeraya was left without a club before being snapped up by Malaysia Premier League bottom-dwellers Putrajaya SPA FC. He had a debut to forget as he scored an own goal in a 3-1 loss to UiTM.

Eunos Crescent FC 
Emuejeraye has failed to earn a professional contract in Singapore and played for amateur side Eunos Crescent in the National Football League, winning the title in 2016.

Churchill Brothers
It was announced in late-November 2017 that Emuejeraye has signed for I-League side Churchill Brothers SC, becoming the first foreign signing for the team in the upcoming season.

International career
In December 2005, he was awarded the citizenship of Singapore and the head coach of the national football team, Radojko Avramovic duly gave him his international debut in a friendly against Denmark on the 26 January 2006. He then became the third Nigerian to play for the national team, after Itimi Dickson and Agu Casmir.

His performances in the national team colours at first were met with criticisms from the supporters, citing that his speed was making the whole defence a liability. But soon, people realised that he was able to use his sheer build and strength to make up for the lack of speed and soon became a firm fixture in the first team of the national squad.

As of November 2017, Emuejeraye has earned 61 caps for the Singapore national team.

Personal life 
His wife is Nigerian. He is the elder brother of Alfred Emuejeraye and Emmanuel Emuejeraye. He is currently residing in Singapore with his wife and children (2 sons, 1 daughter).

Honours

Club
Gombak United 
 Singapore League Cup: 2008
Sriwijaya
 Piala Indonesia: 2010
Eunos Crescent 
 National Football League: 2016

International
Singapore
 AFF Championship 2007

References

External links
Player profile – doha-2006.com

1983 births
Living people
Singaporean footballers
Singapore international footballers
Nigerian footballers
Nigerian emigrants to Singapore
Singaporean people of Nigerian descent
Expatriate footballers in Indonesia
Expatriate footballers in Malaysia
Naturalised citizens of Singapore
Geylang International FC players
Gombak United FC players
Woodlands Wellington FC players
Home United FC players
Singapore Premier League players
Singaporean expatriate footballers
Singaporean expatriate sportspeople in Indonesia
Sriwijaya F.C. players
Persija Jakarta players
Persiba Balikpapan players
Persidafon Dafonsoro players
Liga 1 (Indonesia) players
Association football central defenders
Jurong FC players
Young Lions FC players
Footballers at the 2006 Asian Games
Asian Games competitors for Singapore
Sportspeople from Abeokuta